Euryops arabicus is a species of flowering plant in the family Asteraceae that grows in the form of a bush. It is found on the Arabian Peninsula, Socotra, Somalia and Djibouti. Its natural habitat is subtropical or tropical dry shrubland.

Description

The narrow lanceolate leaves are leathery and are concentrated towards the tips of the branches.

Distribution and habitat
Euryops arabicus is found in the Arabian Peninsula where it grows in the cloud forest on north-facing slopes in montane woodland, and it is also found on the higher parts of Socotra, in Somalia and Djibouti.

Ecology
In Saudi Arabia it grows alongside Juniperus procera, draped with the lichen Usnea articulata. It is unpalatable and may flourish in places where other shrubs are overgrazed.

References

arabicus
Flora of Saudi Arabia